Jayasree Bhattacharya is an Indian film and theater director. She directed Pati Parameswar (2014) and Binisutormala (Blossoms of War) (2010) for which she won Best Director Award at the India International Women's Film Festival.  The Mat (Madur) is another of her directorial ventures which won the Best Film award at the Dhaka International Film Festival. She has also directed several telefilms including Math Madan which won the Best Telefilm award in Sunfeast Telesamman Sambad Protidin in 2007, Chilekothar Sepaira and Noechoe which were selected and screened at Nandan Telefilm Festival. Jayasree has assisted renowned film directors including Buddhadeb Dasgupta and Rituparno Ghosh. She has worked as a casting director in international productions such as Sara Gravion's Brick Lane, Sangeeta Dutta's Life Goes On and Italo Spinelli's Behind the Bodice (2009).

Early life 
Jayasree Bhattacharyya was born in Kolkata on 14 October 1970.  Her father was eminent professor and singer Jibon Chandra Bhattacharyya, and her mother is painter Jaya Bhattacharyya. She is also the great grandchild of Gyan Chandra Bhattacharyya (Bedanta Bagis)  who was the private tutor of Rabindranath Tagore.  Jayasree studied at Holy Child Institute, Adi Mahakali Pathshala and Bramho Balika Shikshalaya in Kolkata.  She did her B.Sc from Vidyasagar Day College and M.Sc from Calcutta University.  During her early career days Jayasree worked as a regular voice artist of several audio advertisement and short plays.

Theater 
Jayasree was active in theater since her days at Vidyasagar College. She joined the theater group Nirbak Abhinay Academy,  and Sutrapat. She worked as an actress under eminent theatre director Asit Mukhopadhyay, Rama Prasad Banik, Ashoke Mukherjee, Bivas Chakraborty, Anjan Dev, Soumitra Basu and Jayati Basu.  Jayasree joined the National School of Drama TIE Wing as an artist teacher.  She has directed theatre workshops in the northeast - Meghalaya & Tripura.  Jayasree Bhattacharya is the founder of Pragya Cultural Center, a theater group in Kolkata. This group works especially with marginalized children, physically and mentally challenged youth and kids as well as senior citizens.

Film career 
Jayasree joined the film industry as an assistant director. She has directed many critically acclaimed short films and telefilms. She worked as an assistant director with the renowned Buddhadev Dasgupta - assisting him in films including Uttara, Mondo Meyer Upakhyan, Jorasanko Thakurbari, and also in a Doordarshan documentary - Colors and Lines of Freedom.  She assisted Rituparno Ghosh in Shubho Mahurat, a film based on Agatha Christie's Miss Marple story The Mirror Crack'd from Side to Side, and Chokher Bali, based on Rabindranath Tagore's novel of the same name. She also assisted Rabi Kinagi in Champion, Mastan and Premi in 2004. Some of the other directors she assisted are Nepal Dev Bhattacharyya, Biresh Chattopadhyay, Biplab Chatterjee.

Filmography
Pati Parameswar (2014)
Binisutormala (Blossoms of War) (2010) 
The Mat (Madur) 
Math Madan (2007) (telefilm) 
Chilekothar Sepaira (telefilm) 
Noechoe (telefilm)

References

Bengali film directors
Indian women film directors
Indian theatre directors
Living people
1970 births
Film directors from Kolkata